"Party People" is a song recorded by American rapper Nelly, featuring American singer Fergie. It was recorded for Nelly's fifth studio album, Brass Knuckles, and the deluxe edition of Fergie's debut album, The Dutchess.

Background
The song was originally intended for Fergie's debut album, The Dutchess (on the Deluxe Edition of which it now appears), and featured Miami-based rapper Trina. Originally, the track was played and intended to feature Houston rapper Chamillionaire, before he passed up on the offer. In yet another (see "Love in This Club") example of Polow da Don releasing tracks or beats before they were intended, he then played the track for Nelly who immediately decided that he wanted to use the beat.

Music video

The video was shot in Los Angeles, California and directed by Marc Webb. Polow da Don, Keri Hilson and Ciara make cameos in the video.

The video premiered on MTV on April 14, 2008.
The video begins with many lights switching on revealing a large underground room where the room is suddenly filled with many people. We see Fergie on a swing high above the ground while Nelly rises up out of the ground in a cloud of smoke. The rest of the video continues with Nelly and Fergie rapping into the camera while breaking up fights at the party and images of Fergie walking along a walkway as well as jumping on Nelly's back. In the middle of the video Nelly and Fergie rap aggressively at each other atop a raised platform before another short image shows Fergie sitting on the swing again. The video ends with a cameo from R&B singer Keri Hilson sporting a black T-shirt sporting the slogan "Hip Hop Aint Dead".

Nelly and Fergie performed "Party People" at the 2008 BET Awards.

Track listing
UK CD single
 "Party People" (Clean)
 "Party People" (Explicit)
 "Cut It Out"

Charts

Weekly charts

Year-end charts

References

External links

2008 singles
Nelly songs
Song recordings produced by Polow da Don
Songs written by Polow da Don
Songs written by Sean Garrett
Music videos directed by Marc Webb
Universal Motown Records singles
Songs written by Nelly
Songs written by Fergie (singer)
Songs about parties
2007 songs